The Brightside World Tour was the fourth concert tour by American folk rock band The Lumineers, in support of their fourth studio album, Brightside (2022). The tour began on February 24, 2022, in Nottingham, and concluded on September 3, 2022, in Chicago.

Background
On May 20, 2021, the band first announced tour dates in Europe for early 2022. These dates were originally announced as a standalone leg before Brightside was first announced. On February 8, 2022, the band then officially announced the Brightside World Tour, making the European leg now part of the tour, along with announcing North American dates for summer 2022. The tour was set to begin on February 1, 2022, in Prague, but instead began on February 24, 2022, in Nottingham due to ongoing concerns of the COVID-19 pandemic. Several shows from this tour were rescheduled from III: The World Tour back in 2020. Tickets from the postponed III: The World Tour dates were honored at the new dates for this tour.

Tour dates

Notes

References

2022 concert tours
The Lumineers